The Footman is a public house in Charles Street, Mayfair, long famous for its sign, which used to read, in full, I am the only Running Footman.  At 24 characters, this was the longest pub name in London until modern pubs were created with fanciful names such as The Ferret and Firkin in the Balloon up the Creek.

Footmen were originally employed to run ahead of a carriage to ensure the way was clear. As roads got better and clearer the demand for their services fell away and many were re-employed as household servants. One footman instead bought the tavern, then called the Running Horse, and renamed it after himself.

The establishment was first built in 1749 and rebuilt in the 1930s.

The pub is believed to have been the inspiration for the Junior Ganymede Club, a fictional club in P. G. Wodehouse's Jeeves stories. It is a significant location in Martha Grimes's 1986 mystery novel I Am the Only Running Footman, which takes its title from the pub.

References

Mayfair
Pubs in the City of Westminster